Rodowan (1067—died after 1071) was a nobleman who served Solomon, the King of Hungary, as palatine, the highest court title, around 1067. He died after 1070. He was the son of Bogát (Bagath). He is an ancestor of the Bogát-Radvány family of Bohemia. His name, as well as that of his father, suggests that he was a Slav.

References

Sources
 Markó, László (2006). A magyar állam főméltóságai Szent Istvántól napjainkig – Életrajzi Lexikon ("The High Officers of the Hungarian State from Saint Stephen to the Present Days – A Biographical Encyclopedia") (2nd edition); Helikon Kiadó Kft., Budapest;  
 Zsoldos, Attila (2011). Magyarország világi archontológiája, 1000–1301 ("Secular Archontology of Hungary, 1000–1301"). História, MTA Történettudományi Intézete. Budapest.  

Palatines of Hungary
11th-century Hungarian people
11th-century births
11th-century deaths
Bogátradvány (genus)